"Wildfire" is a song performed by American contemporary Christian music singer Crowder. It was released as one of the first singles from his third studio album, I Know a Ghost (2018), alongside "Red Letters" on September 19, 2018. Crowder co-wrote the song with Rebecca Lauren Olds and Solomon Olds.

"Wildfire" peaked at No. 43 on the US Hot Christian Songs chart. "Wildfire" won the GMA Dove Award for Rock/Contemporary Recorded Song of the Year at the 2019 GMA Dove Awards.

Background
Crowder released "Wildfire" alongside "Red Letters" in September 2018 as the first singles from his studio album I Know a Ghost, which was slated for release on November 9, 2018.

Composition
The song has a swamp rock sound, which also incorporates funk, dance and R&B, and is "complete with a chorus of crickets, frogs & other creatures interspersed throughout the track," as Crowder "relays to us the notion that wildfire from Jesus set us free from sin."

Reception

Critical response
Robert Crawford of Rolling Stone praised the single, describing it as "a loud, club-worthy banger doubling as a church anthem." Joshua Andre of 365 Days of Inspiring Media gave a review of "Wildfire", describing the song as being "experimental as ever," and concluding "It's a bit from left field to hear Crowder half-screaming in the chorus, yet I am sure that this song will grow on me in the future."

Accolades

Commercial performance
"Wildfire" debuted at number 43 on the US Hot Christian Songs chart dated November 24, 2018.

Music videos
Crowder released audio video of "Wildfire" showcasing the single artwork through YouTube on September 19, 2018. Crowder published the lyric video of "Wildfire" via YouTube on October 12, 2018. On March 13, 2019, Crowder released the official music video for "Wildfire" on YouTube.

Track listing

Charts

Release history

References

External links
 

2018 singles
2018 songs
Crowder (musician) songs
Sparrow Records singles